Virsad is a village located in the taluka of Borsad, the district of Anand within the state of Gujarat, India.

Villages in Anand district